Baliqchi may refer to:

 Baliqchi
 Baliqchi, Iran
 Baliqchi, Uzbekistan
 Baliqchi District, Uzbekistan
 Balykchy, a city in Kyrgyzstan